Steve Braun (born August 14, 1976) is a Canadian television and movie actor from Winnipeg, Manitoba. Braun's credits include The Immortal, a TV show in which he and co-star Lorenzo Lamas hunted demons; The Trip, an independent film about coming of age in the HIV era; and Harold & Kumar Go to White Castle (2004), a major motion picture release in which he plays the leader of a group of obnoxious punks. In addition he starred as Brian Kelly in the 2004 thriller The Skulls III. He also played the role of "Jonesy" in the 2007 thriller movie Wrong Turn 2: Dead End.  He also co-starred in the 2005 horror movie "Pterodactyl" as Willis Bradbury.

Braun was cast in a recurring guest role in The WB show Twins, as Jordan, the unrequited love interest of Mitchee Arnold, played by Sara Gilbert. The series, which debuted on September 16, 2005, was cancelled in May, 2006.

References

External links

1976 births
Living people
Male actors from Winnipeg
Canadian male film actors
Canadian male television actors
Canadian male voice actors